Elections to the Baseball Hall of Fame for 1964 followed the system introduced for even-number years in 1962. The Baseball Writers' Association of America (BBWAA) voted by mail to select from recent major league players with provision for a second, "runoff" election in the event of no player receiving enough votes for induction. The runoff was necessary this year, with Luke Appling the winner. Further, the eligibility of retired players was reduced from having retired 30 years prior to election to 20 years prior.

Meanwhile, the Veterans Committee was meeting annually to consider executives, managers, umpires, and earlier major league players. It selected six people: Red Faber, Burleigh Grimes, Miller Huggins, Tim Keefe, Heinie Manush, and John Montgomery Ward. A formal induction ceremony was held in Cooperstown, New York, on July 27, 1964, with Commissioner of Baseball Ford Frick presiding.

BBWAA election
The BBWAA was authorized to elect players active in 1944 or later, but not after 1958. All 10-year members of the BBWAA were eligible to vote.

Voters were instructed to cast votes for up to 10 candidates; any candidate receiving votes on at least 75% of the ballots would be honored with induction to the Hall. A total of 58 players received votes; 201 ballots were cast, with 151 votes required for election. A total of 1,632 individual votes were cast, an average of 8.12 per ballot.

No one reached the threshold so there was a runoff election featuring the 30 leading candidates. There would be one winner  regardless of numerical support on the second ballot; in fact, winner Luke Appling tallied 189 of 201 votes or 94%. A total of 939 individual votes were cast in the runoff, an average of 4.67 per ballot.

Candidates who were eligible for the first time are indicated here with a dagger (†). Candidates who have since been elected in subsequent elections are indicated in italics. Al López was later elected as a manager.

Chuck Klein, Lloyd Waner, Pepper Martin, Leo Durocher, and Lon Warneke were on the ballot for the final time.

The runoff results show that voters in the second election concentrated their support on the four leaders. Primary results indicate significant gains among returning candidates, with eight players gaining 20 percentage points or more. Between 1962 and 1964, the Hall of Fame reduced eligibility for players to be voted on by the BBWAA from having been retired for at most 30 years to those who had been retired for at most 20 years. This removed numerous popular candidates, including Sam Rice, who had received the most votes among players not elected. Among the 17 candidates to receive at least 10% of the vote in 1962, nine were no longer eligible due to the rule change. Combined with the two candidates who were elected, this meant that of the 17 candidates to receive 10% or more in 1962, only six were appearing on this ballot.

J. G. Taylor Spink Award 
Ring Lardner (1885–1933) received the J. G. Taylor Spink Award honoring a baseball writer. The award was voted at the December 1963 meeting of the BBWAA, and included in the summer 1964 ceremonies.

References

External links
1964 Election at www.baseballhalloffame.org
1964 Runoff Election at www.baseballhalloffame.org

Baseball Hall of Fame balloting
Hall of Fame balloting